Giovanni Fago (born 11 July 1931) is an Italian director and screenwriter.

Born in Rome, Fago began his cinema career in 1959 as assistant director of, among others, Mario Monicelli, Camillo Mastrocinque, Vittorio De Sica, Renato Castellani, Joseph L. Mankiewicz, Lucio Fulci. In 1967 he became a director, consecutively filming three spaghetti westerns, Per 100.000 dollari ti ammazzo, Uno di più all'inferno and O' Cangaçeiro. During the 1970s and the 1980s he focused primarily on television works.

References

External links 
 

Writers from Rome
Italian film directors
Italian male writers
Spaghetti Western directors
1931 births
Living people